The 1993 All-Ireland Senior Football Championship Final was the 106th All-Ireland Final and the deciding match of the 1993 All-Ireland Senior Football Championship. The match was played in Croke Park in Dublin on 19 September 1993.

Ulster champions Derry took on Munster champions Cork, in what was their first ever meeting in a final. Cork's last title had come in 1990, while Derry had never won the competition, and last contested a final in 1958. Derry won the match by 1–14 to 2–8 to win the Sam Maguire Cup for the first time.

Match summary
Derry won their first and only All-Ireland with a Seamus Downey goal. Cork's Tony Davis was sent off harshly.	

Henry Downey captained the victorious Derry team.

Match details

Aftermath
Derry's manager that day was Eamonn Coleman. When Coleman died in 2007, the All-Ireland winning squad formed a guard of honour at his funeral.

Cork player Joe Kavanagh, who also played in their 1999 defeat to Meath, described 1999 as being as bad as 1993.

References

External links
Match Highlights
Front Page of Irish Independent 20 September 1993
My Greatest Game: 1993 All-Ireland winning Derry hero Enda Gormley

1
All-Ireland Senior Football Championship Final
All-Ireland Senior Football Championship Final, 1993
All-Ireland Senior Football Championship Finals
All-Ireland Senior Football Championship Finals
Cork county football team matches
Derry county football team matches